The Workers' Socialist Party (or PST) was a leftist political party in Chile that existed between 1940 and 1944.

The party was founded by a faction of expelled of the Socialist Party of Chile. They were known as nonconformists, as they did not want to continue supporting the government of Pedro Aguirre Cerda and the Popular Front. In spite of this, they were integrated to the Democratic Alliance of Chile.

Among its members were César Godoy Urrutia, Carlos Muller, Emilio Zapata Díaz, Carlos Rosales, Natalio Berman and Jorge Dowling. Also included was the secretary general of the Socialist Youth Federation, Orlando Millas.

On June 18, 1944, the party was dissolved when most of its militants joined the Communist Party of Chile. A minority decided to return to the Socialist Party.

See also
Socialist Party of Chile
Communist Party of Chile

Bibliography 
 Arrate, Jorge y Eduardo Rojas. 2006. Memoria de la Izquierda Chilena. Tomo I (1850–1970). Javier Vergara Editor.
 Cruz Coke, Ricardo. 1984. Historia electoral de Chile. 1925–1973. Editorial Jurídica de Chile. Santiago.
 Jordi Fuentes y Lia Cortes. 1967. Diccionario político de Chile. Editorial Orbe. Santiago.
 Jobet, Julio César. 1971. El Partido Socialista de Chile. Ediciones Prensa Latinoamericana. Santiago.
 Millas, Orlando. 1993. En tiempos del Frente Popular. Memorias, volumen I. CESOC. Santiago.

Defunct political parties in Chile
Socialist parties in Chile
Socialist Party of Chile
Political parties established in 1940
Political parties disestablished in 1944
1940 establishments in Chile
1944 disestablishments in Chile